Penny Gillies (born 20 July 1951) is an Australian hurdler. She competed in the 100 metres hurdles at the 1972 Summer Olympics and the 1980 Summer Olympics.

References

1951 births
Living people
Athletes (track and field) at the 1972 Summer Olympics
Athletes (track and field) at the 1980 Summer Olympics
Australian female hurdlers
Olympic athletes of Australia
Place of birth missing (living people)